Thomas Florie (September 6, 1897 – April 26, 1966) was an American soccer forward. He played in both the first and second American Soccer Leagues, winning two National Challenge Cup titles.  Florie was also a member of the United States men's national soccer team at the 1930 and 1934 FIFA World Cup. He was inducted into the U.S. National Soccer Hall of Fame in 1986.

Early career
Born in New Jersey to Italian immigrant parents, Florie played soccer as a youth, but service in the Navy during World War I delayed the start of his career.  In 1922, Florie signed with Harrison S.C. of the American Soccer League.  However, he only played three games before leaving Harrison to play for American A.A. in the West Hudson Amateur League.

American Soccer League
In 1924, Florie returned to the ASL when he signed with Providence F.C.  He quickly established himself as one of the top wing forwards in the league.  In 1928, he began the season with Providence, now known as the Gold Bugs, before moving to New Bedford Whalers II.  He later joined Fall River F.C. but, the team only lasted the spring season before merging with the New York Yankees to become New Bedford Whalers III.  In 1932, the Whalers defeated Stix, Baer and Fuller F.C., 8–5 on aggregate in the  National Challenge Cup final.  Florie scored one goal in each of the two games.    Despite this victory, the Whalers collapsed that fall, followed soon after by the entire league.  Florie then moved to the Pawtucket Rangers which had jumped to the second American Soccer League.  In 1934, Florie was on the losing side in the National Challenge Cup when the Rangers fell to Stix, Baer and Fuller in three games.  By that time, the Rangers had left the ASL.  In 1941, Florie won his second National Cup when Pawtucket F.C. defeated Detroit Chrysler, 8–5 on aggregate, with Florie scoring one goal.

National team
Florie earned eight caps, scoring two goals, with the U.S. national team from 1925 to 1934.  His first cap came in a 1–0 loss to Canada on June 27, 1925.  His second came a year later, this time a 6–2 win over Canada in which Florie scored.  Florie was not called into the national team for the 1928 Olympics, but was called up for the 1930 FIFA World Cup.  He was named as the team captain as the U.S. went to the semifinals before falling to Argentina.  His last national team game came in the first round loss to Italy in the 1934 FIFA World Cup.
He was the last player born in the 19th century who played at a world cup.

Florie was inducted into the National Soccer Hall of Fame in 1986.

International goals
United States' goal tally first

References

External links
Profile at the National Soccer Hall of Fame
1930 World Cup team photo

1897 births
1930 FIFA World Cup players
1966 deaths
American soccer players
People from Harrison, New Jersey
Soccer players from New Jersey
Sportspeople from Hudson County, New Jersey
United States men's international soccer players
National Soccer Hall of Fame members
1934 FIFA World Cup players
United States Navy personnel of World War I
American Soccer League (1921–1933) players
Harrison S.C. players
Providence Clamdiggers players
Providence Gold Bug players
New Bedford Whalers players
Fall River F.C. players
Pawtucket Rangers players
American Soccer League (1933–1983) players
American people of Italian descent
Association football forwards